M. Chinnadurai is an Indian politician who is a Member of Legislative Assembly of Tamil Nadu. He was elected from Gandharvakottai as a Communist Party of India (Marxist) candidate in 2021.

Elections contested

References 

Tamil Nadu MLAs 2021–2026
Living people
Year of birth missing (living people)